The Mamatwan mine is a mine located in the west of South Africa in Northern Cape. Mamatwan represents one of the largest manganese reserves in South Africa having estimated reserves of 433 million tonnes of manganese ore grading 40% manganese metal.

See also
Nchwaning mine
Wessels mine
Gloria mine

References 

Manganese mines
Manganese mines in South Africa
Economy of the Northern Cape
Geography of the Northern Cape